The 2004–05 ISU Short Track Speed Skating World Cup was a multi-race tournament over a season for short track speed skating. The season began on 22 October 2004 and ended on 12 February 2005. The World Cup was organised by the International Skating Union who also ran world cups and championships in speed skating and figure skating.

The World Cup consisted of six tournaments in this season.

Calendar

Men

China

Beijing, China

United States

Canada

Hungary

Slovakia

Women

China

Beijing, China

United States

Canada

Hungary

Slovakia

Overall Standings

Men

Women

See also
 2005 World Short Track Speed Skating Championships
 2005 World Short Track Speed Skating Team Championships
 2005 European Short Track Speed Skating Championships

References

External Links
 Results for 2004-2005 SEASON at the International Skating Union

ISU Short Track Speed Skating World Cup
2004 in short track speed skating
2005 in short track speed skating